"Lindisfarne / Unluck" is a double A-side single by English dubstep producer and singer-songwriter James Blake, released as the third single from his self-titled debut album. The single was released as a digital download on the iTunes Store on 16 June 2011 and on 10" vinyl the following day.

Song information

Lindisfarne
"Lindisfarne" shows elements of folktronica, trip hop, and soul music. It has extensive use of auto-tune, vocoders and multi-layered vocals over acoustic guitar playing.

On the album, the song is split up into 2 parts; "Lindisfarne I" and "Lindisfarne II". On the single, the two are combined into one shortened track, "Lindisfarne (Edit)"

Unluck
"Unluck" is an electronic song that brings out elements of IDM, trip hop, and post-dubstep. It is in the same form as it is on the album.

Music video

A music video was released for "Lindisfarne (Edit)" to Blake's VEVO page on YouTube. As of 18 September 2019, the music video has 1,166,506 views.

There was no video released for "Unluck".

Track listing

Personnel
Credits adapted from Discogs.

Song
 James Blake – songwriting, production
 Rob McAndrews – acoustic guitar and songwriting on "Lindisfarne (Edit)"

Artwork
 Helen Litherland – artwork
 Alexander Brown – design

Music video
 Martin De Thura – director

References

External links
 James Blake – Lindisfarne (Music Video on YouTube)

James Blake (musician) songs
2011 singles
Electronica songs
Songs written by James Blake (musician)
2011 songs